Osho (1931–1990), also known as Rajneesh, was an Indian mystic, guru and philosopher.

Osho may also refer to:

Other people
 Andi Osho (born 1973), British comedian, actress and writer
 Gabriel Osho (born 1998), English professional footballer
 Josh Osho (born 1992), English singer-songwriter
 Pierre Osho (born 1945), former defense minister of Benin
 Set Osho (born 1986), Nigerian-born UK sprinter
 Eugenia Osho-Williams (born 1961), Sierra Leonean sprinter

Other uses
 Oshō, a Japanese term used in various schools of Buddhism
 Ōshō (shogi), a title in Japanese professional shogi strategy board game competition
 Ōshō Station, a train station in Toyama, Japan
 Osho movement, an alternative name for the Rajneesh movement
 Osho Times, a publication related to the Rajneesh movement
 Osho Monsoon Festival, an international festival of music and meditation for members of the Rajneesh movement

See also